My Dark Places may refer to:
My Dark Places (book), a 1996 non-fiction book by American crime-fiction writer James Ellroy
My Dark Places (album), a 2006 British album by the Television Personalities